The Record (stylised in lowercase) is the upcoming debut studio album by American indie rock supergroup Boygenius, composed of Julien Baker, Phoebe Bridgers, and Lucy Dacus. It is set to be released on March 31, 2023, through Interscope.

Background and release
After releasing their debut self-titled EP Boygenius in 2018, the trio had since been working on their solo projects and had all released their respective albums — Little Oblivions by Julien Baker, Punisher by Phoebe Bridgers, and Home Video by Lucy Dacus — before performing as a group for the first time in 3 years on November 19, 2021.

The group was spotted doing a photoshoot together in November 2022. On January 10, 2023, Boygenius was announced to be on the 2023 Coachella lineup. There had been rumors about their new project since the two incidents.

On January 18, 2023, Boygenius announced the album, along with the release of three lead singles, "$20", "Emily I'm Sorry", and "True Blue".

On March 1, 2023, Boygenius released the album's fourth single "Not Strong Enough", along with an accompanying music video edited by Bridgers' brother Jackson Bridgers. The song will be sent to adult album alternative and alternative radio in the United States on March 13 and March 28, 2023, respectively.

Track listing

References

2023 debut albums
Boygenius albums
Interscope Records albums
Upcoming albums